The Transformers: Generations is a comic book title, published by IDW Publishing.  The series was launched in March 2006 and conceived to be a nine-issue  miniseries, but has since become an ongoing title.  The series consists of republished editions of the original Marvel Transformers comics, but featuring new cover art by various artists. The series finished at issue 12. However, IDW have continued to reprint older material, including Dreamwave's Transformers: Armada comic in their Transformers Magazine, as well as condensed reprints of the Marvel UK tale Target: 2006. IDW continues to reprint Marvel UK material, beginning with issues focusing on the Dinobots.

Issues

Marvel US reprints
Issue #1: Reprint of The Transformers (Marvel US) #7 by Bob Budiansky and William Johnson, cover art by Nick Roche, Ashley Wood
Issue #2–3: Reprint of The Transformers (Marvel US) #13–14 by Bob Budiansky and Don Perlin, cover art by Nick Roche, Ashley Wood
Issue #4: Reprint of The Transformers (Marvel US) #16 by Len Kaminski and Graham Nolan, cover art by Nick Roche
Issue #5: Reprint of The Transformers (Marvel US) #17 by Bob Budiansky and Graham Nolan, cover art by Nick Roche, Ashley Wood
Issue #6: Reprint of The Transformers (Marvel US) #18 by Bob Budiansky and Don Perlin, cover art by Nick Roche
Issue #7–8: Reprint of The Transformers (Marvel US) #24–25 by Bob Budiansky and Don Perlin, cover art by Nick Roche
Issue #9: Reprint of The Transformers (Marvel US) #27 by Bob Budiansky and Don Perlin, cover art by Nick Roche
Issue #10–12: Reprint of The Transformers (Marvel US) #29–31 by Bob Budiansky and Don Perlin, cover art by Nick Roche

The Transformers: Target: 2006
Issue #1: Reprint of The Transformers "Target: 2006" by Simon Furman and Geoff Senior, cover art by Nick Roche
Issue #2–4: Reprint of The Transformers "Target: 2006" by Simon Furman, Jeff Anderson and Will Simpson, cover art by Nick Roche
Issue #5: Reprint of The Transformers "Target: 2006" by Simon Furman, Geoff Senior, Jeff Anderson and Will Simpson, cover art by Nick Roche

The Transformers: Best of UK: Dinobots
Issue #1: Reprint of The Transformers "The Icarus Theory" by Simon Furman and Barry Kitson, cover art by Nick Roche

References

Generations
IDW Publishing titles
2006 comics debuts